The Ministry of Astronautics Industry of the People's Republic of China was a ministry of the government of the People's Republic of China which is responsible for the management of research, design and production of rockets, missiles and spacecraft. The ministry was headquartered in Beijing. It existed from 1988 to 1993.

History
On April 12, 1988, the People's Republic of China merged its Ministry of Aviation Industry and Ministry of Aerospace Industry to form the Ministry of Astronautics Industry.

In March 1993, the ministry was disestablished during the institutional reform of the State Council. Its responsibilities were assumed by the China Aerospace Industry Corporation.

Leaders
Minister: 

See also
China Aerospace Science and Technology Corporation
China Aerospace Science and Industry Corporation

References

Astronautics
China, Astronautics Industry
China, Astronautics Industry
1988 establishments in China
1993 disestablishments in China